Luxembourg competed at the 1920 Summer Olympics in Antwerp, Belgium.

Medalists

Aquatics

Swimming

Two swimmers, both men, represented Luxembourg in 1920. It was the nation's debut in the sport. Neither of the swimmers advanced past the quarterfinals.

Ranks given are within the heat.

 Men

Athletics

Seven athletes represented Luxembourg in 1920. It was the nation's third appearance in athletics, having competed in the sport each time Luxembourg had appeared at the Olympics. The country's best result of the Games was a sixth-place finish in the 4x100 relay.

Ranks given are within the heat.

Cycling

A single cyclist represented Luxembourg in 1920. It was the nation's debut in the sport. Majérus did not advance past the initial heats in the sprint event, and did not finish the 50 kilometres.

Track cycling

Ranks given are within the heat.

Football

Luxembourg competed in the Olympic football tournament for the first time. The team lost to the Netherlands in the first round.

 Team roster
Charles Krüger
Joseph Koetz
Thomas Schmit
Émile Hamilius
Martin Ungeheuer
Camille Schumacher
Arthur Leesch
Joseph Massard
Robert Elter
François Langers
Léon Metzler

 First round

Final rank 10th

Weightlifting

Three weightlifters represented Luxembourg in 1920. It was the nation's debut in the sport. Alzin won the country's first medal in the sport, a silver in the heavyweight.

Wrestling

Two wrestlers, both in the Greco-Roman style, competed for Luxembourg in 1920. Both men lost all of their matches.

Greco-Roman

References

 
 
International Olympic Committee results database

Nations at the 1920 Summer Olympics
1920
Olympics